Amrus Natalsya (born 21 October 1933) - an Indonesian painter and wood sculpture artist.

Life and creativity 
Amrus was born in Natal, North Sumatra. His given name was Amrus, but when he went to school in Yogyakarta, he added Natalsya to the last name, taken from his hometown name "Natal" and his grandfather name "Syah Alam", a prosecutor who was good at playing the violin. Amrus completed his elementary school in Natal, and continued high school in Medan. When he lived in Medan, he was a ticket cinema scalper and often quarrel to get that.  

After graduating from high school, he entered the Academy of Fine Arts of Indonesia in Yogyakarta in 1954. At the student exhibition at the Museum of Javanese Culture "Sono Budoyo" his wooden sculpture "A Forgotten Blind" was purchased by the president Sukarno. In the same year in Bandung, he participated in an exhibition timed to the Bandung Conference of Asia and Africa, where he exhibited his new wooden work “Unheard Cries”, which was praised by critics; the American art critic Claire Holt wrote: ...  How amazing the artist presented the suffering and the struggle of the spirit at this exhibition. Amrus is the most original young sculptor with such quality works that you rarely see in other Indonesian artists. - 

In 1957, he held his first solo exhibition in Jakarta, the first exhibition under the open sky in Indonesia. He presented his wooden sculptures up to four meters high. In 1959, Batara Lubis, the cartoonist A. Sibarani and him represented Indonesia at the International Youth Week in Vienna, and on the way back they visited the Soviet Union and China. The following year he went to Jidda at the invitation of the mayor of the city to make a wooden panel with calligraphy. At the same time he performed Hajj.

In 1960, at a student exhibition in Jakarta, he exhibited paintings on canvas, and again they attracted Sukarno’s attention: he bought the canvas "My friends" (1959). In 1961, together with other students (Misbach Tamrin, Kuslan Budiman, Adrianus Gumelar, and others) he created the Bumi Tarung art workshop in Jakarta. At the same time he took part in the activities of the People's Cultural Association (Lekra), which was under the auspices of the Communist Party of Indonesia.

After the events of September 30, 1965 he was arrested and held in jail without trial and investigation until 1973. After his release from prison he worked in his workshop at the Anchol Arts Bazaar. Here he mastered a new genre - pictures on the boards, which became very popular among collectors.

But he did not abandon his old passion for wooden sculpture - a series of sculptures "Noah's Ark" in 1998 at the exhibition in the Cultural Center of Jakarta was recognized as the best work of the exhibition and was acquired by the museum of the university "Pelita Harapan". As for the pictures on the boards, the most impressive series is "China Town", which he made under the influence of anti-Chinese pogroms in 1998 and exhibited in the prestigious Mon Monk Gallery (1999). Later, another solo exhibition was held in this gallery (2004) and the Canna gallery (2005). The most significant collection of his paintings and sculptures belongs to the Indonesian collector Etti Mustafa, who has been collecting his works since 1995.

Publications 
 Puisi-Puisi Amrus Natalsya. Banjarmasin: Tahura Media, 2015

See also
 Natalsya, Amrus (1933--) - Routledge Encyclopedia of Modernism
Agus Dermawan T. Kayu-kayu berlagu: seni lukis kayu. [Jakarta]: Kawan Lama Abdi Bangsa, 2010. (Catalog of wooden painting by Amrus Natalsya)

References 

Woodworking
1933 births
Living people
20th-century Indonesian painters
Minangkabau people
Political repression in Indonesia
Members of the Lembaga Kebudajaan Rakjat

id:Amrus Natalsya